The Indian Fields are a collection of historic sites in Brevard County, Florida. They are located on the southeast bank of Ruth Lake, approximately eight miles west of Titusville. On April 14, 1994, they were added to the U.S. National Register of Historic Places.

References

External links
 Brevard County listings at National Register of Historic Places
 Brevard County listings at Florida's Office of Cultural and Historical Programs

Archaeological sites in Florida
National Register of Historic Places in Brevard County, Florida
Geography of Brevard County, Florida